Yang Shanping (born 28 October 1987) is a Chinese footballer who currently plays for Dalian Professional in the Chinese Super League.

Club career
Yang Shanping started his football career with Liaoning Whowin when he made his debut on 15 May 2005 in a 3-1 win against Shenzhen Jianlibao. After making his debut, he would become a regular and vital member within the team's defence. When he missed much of the 2008 league season, the team's performances suffered and Liaoning was subsequently relegated to the second tier. When Yang returned into the team, he would immediately aid them in their promotion push and saw the club win the second tier league title.

Yang transferred to Chinese Super League newcomer Tianjin Quanjian on 2 January 2017. He made his debut for Tianjin on 4 March 2017 in a 2–0 away loss against Guangzhou R&F.

On 28 February 2018, Yang was loaned to Dalian Yifang (now known as Dalian Professional) for the 2018 season, and made a permanent transfer on 13 February 2019.

International career
Yang made his debut for the Chinese national team on 6 June 2013 in a 2-1 loss against Uzbekistan where he came on as a substitute for Zhao Peng.

Career statistics
Statistics accurate as of match played 31 December 2020.

Honours

Club
Liaoning Whowin
China League One: 2009

Notes

References

External links
 
 
Stats at Sohu.com

1987 births
Living people
Chinese footballers
Footballers from Dalian
Liaoning F.C. players
Tianjin Tianhai F.C. players
Dalian Professional F.C. players
Chinese Super League players
China League One players
China international footballers
Association football defenders